The Freedom Party (PvdV) was a short-lived conservative-liberal political party in the Netherlands active from 1946 to 1948. The PvdV was the successor of the Liberal State Party and a predecessor of the modern-day People's Party for Freedom and Democracy (VVD).

Party history
The PvdV was founded on 23 March 1946 by a group around the young liberal Korthals and the director of Heineken. After the foundation they were joined by the rest of the top of the pre-war Liberal State Party. The party was supposed to be less conservative and more modern that its predecessor. In 1948 it merged with social-liberal dissidents from the PvdA, led by Pieter Oud, to become the People's Party for Freedom and Democracy (VVD). In the 1946 elections it received six seats and it was confined to a minor position in opposition.

Ideology and issues
The PvdV was classical liberal party with progressive leanings, committed to individual freedom and free market economics.

Representation
This table shows the PvdV's results in elections to the House of Representatives, Senate and States-Provincial, as well as the party's political leadership: the fractievoorzitter, is the chair of the parliamentary party and the lijsttrekker is the party's top candidate in the general election, these posts are normally taken by the party's leader.

Electorate
The PvdV mainly received support from atheists or latitudinarian Protestants from higher classes: businessmen, civil servants, wealthy farmers, and voters with free professions (such as lawyers and doctors). The party performed particularly well in the major trading cities Amsterdam and Rotterdam, the rich municipalities around Hilversum and the Hague and in northern rural provinces, like Groningen and Drenthe.

Pillarisation
The PvdV lacked a real system of pillarized organisations around it. 'Neutral' organisations, which were not linked to a pillar, often had friendly relations with the PvdV. This included the general broadcasting association AVRO (Algemene Verenigde Radio Omroep, General United Radio Broadcasting Organisation), the general union ANWV (Algemene Nederlandse Werkelieden Vereniging, the General Dutch Workers' Association), furthermore the neutral employers' organisation VNO and the financial paper Het Handelsblad had good relations with the party.

See also
Liberalism in the Netherlands
People's Party for Freedom and Democracy
Democrats 66

References

Defunct political parties in the Netherlands
Liberal parties in the Netherlands
Netherlands 1946
People's Party for Freedom and Democracy
Political parties established in 1946
Political parties disestablished in 1948
1946 establishments in the Netherlands
1948 disestablishments in the Netherlands